Admiral Charles Middleton, 1st Baron Barham, PC (14 October 172617 June 1813) was a Royal Navy officer and politician. As a junior officer he saw action during the Seven Years' War. Middleton was given command of a guardship at the Nore, a Royal Navy anchorage in the Thames Estuary, at the start of the American War of Independence, and was subsequently appointed Comptroller of the Navy. He went on to be First Naval Lord and then First Lord of the Admiralty.

Early life
Charles Middleton was born at Leith, Midlothian to Robert, a customs collector of Bo'ness, Linlithgowshire, and Helen, daughter of Captain Charles Dundas RN and granddaughter of Sir James Dundas of Arniston. He was a nephew of Brigadier-General John Middleton (1678–1739), a grandson of George Middleton DD, and a great-grandson of Alexander Middleton (younger brother of John Middleton, 1st Earl of Middleton), the last two having served as Principal of King's College, Aberdeen.

Naval career
Middleton entered the Royal Navy in 1741 as captain's servant aboard  and HMS Duke, and later served aboard HMS Flamborough as midshipman and master's mate. He became lieutenant in 1745, serving aboard the frigate HMS Chesterfield, after 1748 on the west Africa station.

During the Seven Years' War, from 1754, Middleton was stationed aboard  during her apprehension and capture of two French ships at Louisbourg, after which he was stationed in the Leeward Islands. In January 1757, an incident over rum rations, during which Middleton lost his temper and physically attacked a sailor ended with the sailor being court martialled and Middleton being transferred and promoted to command of the sloop HMS Speaker.

Promoted to post-captain on 22 May 1758, Middleton was given command of the frigate HMS Arundel. From March 1762 Middleton took command of the frigate Adventure, patrolling the coast of Normandy.

In December 1761 Middleton married Margaret Gambier, niece of Captain Mead, who he had encountered aboard HMS Sandwich some twenty years earlier. Margaret moved to Teston in Kent, to be close to her friend Elizabeth Bouverie. In 1763, after service aboard the Adventure, he moved to join Margaret at Teston, and for the next twelve years he farmed the land belonging to Mrs Bouverie, taking on the role of a country gentleman.

In 1775, at the outbreak of the American War of Independence, Middleton was given a guardship at the Nore, a Royal Navy anchorage in the Thames Estuary, and was subsequently appointed Comptroller of the Navy in 1778, a post he held for twelve years. In 1781 was created a baronet, with a special remainder, failing any male issue, to his son in law, Gerard Noel.

In 1784, Sir Charles Middleton was elected Tory Member of Parliament (MP) for Rochester, a seat he held for six years, and on 24 September 1787 he was promoted rear admiral. By 1786 he had become disillusioned with his role as Comptroller of the Navy, seeing it as beset by internal politics between the Admiralty and the Navy Board. In 1786 he prepared a letter to the First Lord of the Admiralty indicating he would "contend no more for the public," and urging the appointment of a successor who could "have more weight than I have had, and influence ministers to correct these evils." The letter was never sent, but Middleton resigned his position in 1790 and effectively retired from naval affairs.

Promotions based on seniority continued to be received, despite Middleton's retirement from active service. On 1 February 1793 he was promoted to vice admiral, and in May 1794 he was appointed to the Board of Admiralty. He became First Naval Lord in March 1795 and was promoted to full admiral on 1 June 1795. He was finally, in May 1805 (at the age of 79), appointed First Lord of the Admiralty. He was also created Baron Barham, of Barham Court and Teston in the County of Kent, with a special remainder, failing male issue, to his only child, his daughter, Diana Noel, 2nd Baroness Barham, and her male heirs. He resigned office in 1806 and died seven years later, aged 86, at his home of Barham Court.

Abolitionist

In addition to his service in the Royal Navy, Middleton played a crucial role in the abolition of the slave trade in the British Empire. He had been influenced by a pamphlet written by Rev. James Ramsay, who served as a surgeon under Middleton aboard HMS Arundel in the West Indies, but later took holy orders and served on the Caribbean island of St Christopher (now St Kitts), where he observed first-hand the treatment of slaves. On his return in 1777, exhausted by the continuing conflict with influential planters and businessmen, Ramsay returned to Britain and briefly lived with Sir Charles and Lady Middleton at Teston. He later became vicar of Teston and rector of Nettlestead, Kent, the livings being in the gift of Middleton.

Ramsay's pamphlet Essay on the Treatment and Conversion of African Slaves in the British Sugar Colonies, published in 1784, especially affected Lady Middleton. Feeling inadequate to take up the issue of the slave trade in Parliament himself, and knowing that it would be a long, hard battle, Sir Charles Middleton suggested the young Member of Parliament  William Wilberforce as the one who might be persuaded to take up the cause. (Whether this was the first time that the issue had been suggested to Wilberforce is debatable). In 1787 Wilberforce was introduced to James Ramsay and Thomas Clarkson at Teston, as well as meeting the growing group of supporters of abolition, which also included Edward Eliot, Hannah More, the evangelical writer and philanthropist, and Beilby Porteus, Bishop of London.

Clarkson had first made public his desire to spend his life fighting for emancipation at Middleton's home, Barham Court, overlooking the River Medway at Teston, Kent. In order to make a case for abolishing the slave trade, Clarkson did much research over many years, gathering evidence by interviewing thousands of sailors who had been involved in the slave trade.

Barham Court was effectively used for planning the campaign by Lord and Lady Barham, with numerous meetings and strategy sessions attended by Wilberforce, Clarkson, Eliot and Porteus before presenting legislation to Parliament. While Middleton never played a direct role in the effort to abolish the slave trade (finally accomplished in 1807) and slavery itself (in 1833) he played a very important part as a behind the scenes facilitator. His efforts were motivated by his evangelical faith.

Legacy
A key leader in the Royal Navy (1778-1807), he was an austere but politically liberal public official. As Comptroller of the Navy, First Lord of the Admiralty, and Commissioner, his success in handling the problems of supply, construction, inefficiency, and insubordination made a critical contribution to Britain's naval victories in the Napoleonic wars, according to Bernard Pool.

Three warships of the Royal Navy have been named Barham in honour of Middleton including the battleship Barham launched in 1914.

Fictional portrayals
Barham is a character in Treason's Tide by Robert Wilton, set during the summer of 1805. He is also portrayed by the simple moniker of Admiral Barham in Naomi Novik's alternative history fiction series, Temeraire, in the second novel, Throne of Jade, (published with Del Rey in 2006) in which he is depicted as arbitrating a dispute between the Chinese delegation and the British government over the possible return of Captain William Laurence's dragon Temeraire to China. His political relationship with William Wilberforce and the Abolitionist movement in Britain is also referenced in the work.

See also

List of abolitionist forerunners

References

Sources

Further reading
 Colquhoun, John Campbell. William Wilberforce: His Friends and His Times (London: Longmans, Green, Reader and Dyer, 1866).

 Moody, Michael E. Religion in the Life of Charles Middleton, First Baron Barham. In 'The Dissenting Tradition: Essays for Leland H. Carlson' ed. Cole, C. Robert and Moody, Michael E. (Athens: Ohio University Press, 1975). 
Morriss, Roger. Charles Middleton in Oxford Dictionary of National Biography (Oxford: University Press, 2006).
 Pollock, John. Wilberforce: God’s Statesman. (Eastbourne: Kingsway Publications, 2001). .
 Pool, Bernard. "Lord Barham: A Great Naval Administrator" History Today (May 1965) 15#5 pp 347–354
 Stott, Anne. Hannah More – The First Victorian (Oxford: University Press, 2003)
 Talbott, John E. The Pen and Ink Sailor: Charles Middleton and the King's Navy, 1778–1813 (London: Routledge, 1998).

External links

|-

|-

|-

|-

1726 births
1813 deaths
Members of the Privy Council of the United Kingdom
Barons Barham
Peers of the United Kingdom created by George III
Royal Navy admirals
Lords of the Admiralty
British abolitionists
Tory members of the Parliament of Great Britain
Members of the Parliament of Great Britain for English constituencies
People from Leith
British MPs 1784–1790
Military personnel from Edinburgh
Royal Navy personnel of the Seven Years' War
Royal Navy personnel of the American Revolutionary War
Royal Navy personnel of the French Revolutionary Wars
Royal Navy personnel of the Napoleonic Wars
Politicians from Edinburgh